Ben Lewis may refer to:

Ben Lewis (Australian actor) (born 1979), British-born Australian musical theatre actor
Ben Lewis (writer), British writer for theatre, radio and television; theatre director; actor and performer
Ben Lewis (editor) (1894–1970), American film editor
Ben Lewis (filmmaker), (born 1966) British filmmaker and art critic
Ben Lewis (footballer) (born 1977), English footballer
Ben Lewis (rugby union) (born 1986), Welsh rugby player
Ben Lewis (Canadian actor) (born 1985), Canadian film and television actor
Ben H. Lewis (1902–1985), mayor of Riverside, California, United States

See also
Benjamin Lewis (disambiguation)